The Alajuela 33 is an American sailboat that was designed by Raymond Richards for cruising and first built in 1977.

Production
The design was built by the Alajuela Yacht Corp in the United States, but it is now out of production.

Design
The Alajuela 33 is a recreational keelboat, built predominantly of fiberglass, with wood trim. It has a cutter rig, with aluminum spars, a spooned raked stem, a canoe transom, a skeg-mounted rudder controlled by a wheel or a tiller and a fixed fin keel. It displaces  and carries  of ballast.

The design provides sleeping accommodation for six people. There is a forward "V"-berth, two main cabin settee berths and two aft quarter berths. The interior trim is teak wood, with a vinyl headliner. The galley is located on the starboard side, amidships and includes a three-burner propane-fired stove, plus an oven. The head is located amidships, on the port side, dividing the cabin into two areas, with the navigation station aft.

Ventilation is provided by two dorade vents, eight bronze-framed ports that open, plus three deck hatches.

The cockpit lazarette provides stowage for propane bottles.

Running backstays are optional and the baby stay for the inner jib may be removed. The design has tracks for the genoa, the staysail and the spinnaker. Sheeting for the mainsail is to a cockpit-mounted traveler with a 4:1 mechanical advantage. The mainsail also has a 2:1 outhaul that is mounted internally.

Operational history
In a 1994 review Richard Sherwood wrote, "there is a long keel for tracking, and the forefoot is cut away for turning. With significant sheer, this boat has a traditional look. The keel is quite thick, as it contains ballast, water, fuel, and the holding tank."

See also
List of sailing boat types

Related development
Alajuela 38

Similar sailboats
Abbott 33
Arco 33
C&C 33
Cape Dory 33
Cape Dory 330
CS 33
Endeavour 33
Hans Christian 33
Hunter 33
Mirage 33
Moorings 335
Nonsuch 33
Tanzer 10
Viking 33
Watkins 33

References

Keelboats
1970s sailboat type designs
Sailing yachts
Sailboat type designs by Raymond Richards
Sailboat types built by Alajuela Yacht Corp